Pet Symmetry is an American emo band from Chicago, Illinois. The band formed in 2012, and they are currently signed to Storm Chaser Records. The band's name is a play on words taken from Stephen King's novel Pet Sematary.

History
Pet Symmetry was formed in 2012 by Erik Czaja and Marcus Nuccio (both members of Chicago-based emo band Dowsing) and Evan Thomas Weiss (who performs solo material under the name Into It. Over It.). 

The band released its first EP, Two Songs About Cars. Two Songs With Long Titles. in May 2013 via Asian Man Records. It released another EP the same month, a split with Dikembe on Storm Chasers Records. 

Later that year in July, they released Five Songs On A Homemade Compact Disc (For A Summer Tour In 2013) on Storm Chasers Records. The EP includes two demos of songs that would later appear on their debut LP. These songs were chosen for a limited run of tour CDs that contained all of their previous material.

On November 25, 2014 the band released another EP, a split with Slingshot Dakota via Soft Speak Records.

In December 2014, Suburbia Records released a 7" box set featuring a split between Pet Symmetry and the Saddest Landscape.

On May 12, 2015, the band released its debut album titled Pets Hounds via Asian Man Records. The album's title is a play on The Beach Boys' album Pet Sounds.

On May 27, 2017, the band released its second album entitled Vision via Polyvinyl Record Co.

On August 2, 2017, the band released the recordings from their Audiotree Live performance via Bandcamp. They performed songs from their album Vision, as well as "My Exhausted Month (Of May)" from Pets Hounds and "A Detailed and Poetic Physical Threat to the Person Who Intentionally Vandalized my 1994 Dodge Intrepid Behind Kate's Apartment" from their first EP, Two Songs About Cars. Two Songs With Long Titles.

On May 25, 2018, they released their Reflection EP via Bandcamp. The EP includes a cover of the Ramones' "Pet Sematary".

Band members
Erik Czaja
Marcus Nuccio
Evan Thomas Weiss

Discography

Studio albums
Pets Hounds (2015, Asian Man Records, Big Scary Monsters (UK/Europe))
Vision (2017, Polyvinyl Record Co.)
Future Suits (2021, Storm Chasers Ltd., Asian Man Records)

EPs and splits
Two Songs About Cars. Two Songs With Long Titles. (2013, Asian Man)
Pet Symmetry/Dikembe (2013, Storm Chasers)
Five Songs On A Homemade Compact Disc (For A Summer Tour In 2013) (2013, Storm Chasers)
Pet Symmetry/Slingshot Dakota (2014, Soft Speak)
Pet Symmetry/The Saddest Landscape (2015, Suburbia)
Reflections (2018, self-release)

References

American power pop groups
Emo musical groups from Illinois
Indie rock musical groups from Illinois
Musical groups established in 2013
Musical groups from Chicago
2013 establishments in Illinois